Emanuel Balaban (January 27, 1895 – April 17, 1973) was a pianist and free-lance conductor who taught at the Eastman School of Music and later at the Juilliard School.

Balaban was born to Joseph Balaban and Olga Ribman Balaban in Brooklyn, New York. He attended the Institute of Musical Art, then studied under Fritz Busch in Germany. Although a pianist (he was accompanist to Efrem Zimbalist, Mischa Elman and Erica Morini), conducting was his goal. He was a conductor at the Dresden State Opera and led orchestra in Berlin, Leipzig, Dresden, New York, and Washington D.C.

From 1929 through 1944 he was Director of the Opera Department at the Eastman School of Music. In 1947 he joined the faculty of the Juilliard School, a position he held until his death. From 1953 to 1956 he was on the faculty of the Berkshire Music Center.

He recorded at two operas composed by Gian Carlo Menotti, The Medium and The Telephone.

Balaban died at St. Barnabas Hospital in New York City. He was married to Priscilla Brown who survived him, as did his siblings Edward Balaban and Stella Appelbaum.

References

External links
Emanuel Balaban scrapbook (Balaban's personal scrapbook) in the Music Division of The New York Public Library for the Performing Arts

1895 births
1973 deaths
20th-century American conductors (music)
American male conductors (music)
Juilliard School alumni
Juilliard School faculty
Musicians from Brooklyn
Tanglewood Music Center faculty
Educators from New York City
20th-century American male musicians